Wetzel Whitaker (1908–1985) was a filmmaker and animator known as Judge Whitaker. Judge Whitaker may also refer to:

Meade Whitaker (1919–2005), judge of the United States Tax Court
Samuel Estill Whitaker (1886–1967), judge of the United States Court of Claims

See also
Charles Evans Whittaker (1901–1973), judge of the United States Court of Appeals for the Eighth Circuit before being elevated to the Supreme Court